Los Lunas is a station on the New Mexico Rail Runner Express commuter rail line, located in Los Lunas, New Mexico, at the intersection of Highway 314 and Courthouse Road. The station began service on December 11, 2006 as the fourth station on the line. Los Lunas Public Transportation has shuttles serving the station. Each of the Rail Runner stations contains an icon to express each community's identity. The icon representing this station is the old Los Lunas train station.

The station has free parking, with 190 spaces, with congestion at the parking lot requiring that an extension be built less than a year after the station originally opened. This extension was opened on April 30, 2007. The mayor of the town admitted that more parking was needed although the extension had recently been built; the next phase of expansion involves building 120 new spaces.

Gallery

References

External links
Stations, Los Lunas Official Rail Runner site

Railway stations in New Mexico
Railway stations in the United States opened in 2006
Buildings and structures in Valencia County, New Mexico
Transportation in Valencia County, New Mexico
2006 establishments in New Mexico